The 2016 Aragon motorcycle Grand Prix was the fourteenth round of the 2016 MotoGP season. It was held at the Ciudad del Motor de Aragón in Alcañiz on 25 September 2016.

Classification

MotoGP
Andrea Iannone was replaced by Michele Pirro after the first practice session.
Jack Miller, who had withdrawn from Misano, was kept out of this round.  Nicky Hayden rode for Marc VDS in Miller's place.

 Alex Lowes was declared unfit to start the race due to a foot injury suffered in a crash during Saturday free practice.

Moto2

 Miguel Oliveira suffered a broken collarbone after being hit by Franco Morbidelli during Friday free practice.

Moto3

Championship standings after the race (MotoGP)
Below are the standings for the top five riders and constructors after round fourteen has concluded.

Riders' Championship standings

Constructors' Championship standings

 Note: Only the top five positions are included for both sets of standings.

References

Aragon
Aragon Motorcycle Grand Prix
Aragon motorcycle Grand Prix
Aragon motorcycle Grand Prix